Stadion Park Mladeži (English: Park of Youth Stadium) is a football stadium in Split, Croatia. It is the second largest football stadium in Split (after Poljud) and is home to the RNK Split football club.

The stadium was built in the 1950s (with initial construction starting in 1949) for RNK Split, who began using it in 1955. The stadium was never completed, although it went through some renovation for the 1979 Mediterranean Games which were hosted by the city.

The stadium has a total capacity of 4,075 and is located in the Brodarica neighbourhood of Split. It also has an athletics track around the pitch, which is mainly used by the Split Athletics Club (ASK). The stadium is equipped with floodlights which were taken from Stari plac Stadium when it was partially demolished during Hajduk Split's move to Poljud in 1979. Apart from the main pitch, there is also a training pitch used by other smaller clubs, such as NK Galeb, with its own stand installed in 2006.

The stadium got its current name in the 1990s. Before that, the stadium and the park around it were called Park skojevaca (English: Park of the members of SKOJ). This area of the city used to be colloquially known as Turska kula (Turkish tower), which was the stadium's original nickname.

External links
Stadion  RNK Split - Radnički Nogometni Klub Split 

Sports venues in Split, Croatia
Park mladezi
Park mladezi
Park mladezi
RNK Split